To thyma or To thima is a 1969 Greek drama film directed and written by Dinos Dimopoulos and starring Kostas Voutsas, Alekos Tzanetakos and Zozo Sampoutzaki

Plot

A working dance, a fiancée, which bitterly works for not having nothing from his little brother that is studying in Athens, they went to the capital because he was in trouble.  He even wanted to check the inside where it causes pains from doing a lot of work.  In Athens, his brother lives the great life, they hanged out with girls and stayed up and paid all his money which he brought from his brother.  The remaining was spent on eating a sexy drink, a juicy singer which she knows his brother arrived in Athens and it was crazy in the house together.  In that way he spent most of his money on their favour, until they ask to pay for recording a record.  Then, his little brother tried to take his situation to his own hands, he noticed that his austere brother, the singer that intervened and gathered even his big brother returned to the countryside and his fiancée, his little brother had a mained to take even his success in agriculture.

Cast 
 Kostas Voutsas ..... Mihalis Koutsopetalos
 Zozo Sapountzaki ..... Bella Boula
 Alekos Tzanetakos ..... Totos Koutsopetalos
 Spyros Kalogirou ..... Stratis
 Athinodoros Prousalis ..... Babis Baglamis
 Nikos Tsoukas ..... Mitsos Tonos
 Nikitas Platis ..... Anestis Kaloubas
 Thanasis Papadopoulos ..... Dinos
 Nikos Paschalidis ..... Sotiris
 Kostas Papachristos ..... doctor

External links
 

1960s Greek-language films
1969 films
Films directed by Dinos Dimopoulos
Greek comedy films